Dirty South Classics is a compilation album by American hip-hop group Goodie Mob. It peaked at #99 on the Billboard charts.

Track listing

References

2003 compilation albums
Goodie Mob albums
LaFace Records albums